Love Aaj Kal Porshu is a Bengali romantic film directed by Pratim D. Gupta, and produced by Shrikant Mohta and Mahendra Soni. The film released on 14 February 2020 under the banner of SVF Entertainment. It stars Arjun Chakraborty, Madhumita Sarkar, Paoli Dam and Anindita Bose.
The story is inspired by two Jim Carrey movies, Eternal Sunshine of a Spotless Mind and The Truman Show.

The film was released theatrically on 14 February 2020,

Cast
 Arjun Chakrabarty as Avik
 Madhumita Sarkar as Tista
 Paoli Dam as 	Kalki Maitra
 Anindita Bose as Leena
 Anirban Chakrabarti as Ganesh
 Abhijit Guha as Botuk

Soundtrack

Marketing and release
The official teaser of film was released on 31 December 2019 by SVF. The film was released theatrically on 14 February 2020,

Critical response
Love Aaj Kal Porshu opened to positive reviews, with critics finding the film's concept novel and treatment fresh.

The Times of India gave the film 3.5/5 calling it "a whiff of fresh air". Raving about the movie, the review said: "It brings in an unusual flavour in Bengali cinema. It thrills you, makes your heart melt in love and most importantly, engages you with its tight script — a perfect concoction for this season of love without being melodramatic."

References

External links
 

2020 films
Bengali-language Indian films
Indian romance films
2020s Bengali-language films
2020 romance films
Films scored by Arindam Chatterjee
Films directed by Pratim D. Gupta